The 1948–49 La Liga was the 18th season since its establishment. Barcelona won their fourth title, the second consecutive.

Team locations

Valladolid made their debut in La Liga. The first club from Castile and León to play in the Primera Division

League table

Results

Top scorers

External links
Official LFP Site 

1948 1949
1948–49 in Spanish football leagues
Spain